Robert Brown "Speed" Kelly (August 19, 1884 – May 6, 1949) was a third baseman in Major League Baseball. He played for the Washington Senators in 1909.

References

External links

1884 births
1949 deaths
Major League Baseball third basemen
Washington Senators (1901–1960) players
Baseball players from Ohio
South Bend Greens players
Denver Grizzlies (baseball) players
South Bend Benders players
Grand Rapids Grads players
Grand Rapids Furniture Makers players
Newark Newks players
Purdue Boilermakers baseball players
People from Bryan, Ohio